This is a timeline of the Ming dynasty (1368–1644) from the rise of the Hongwu Emperor to the rise and establishment of the Qing dynasty.

Background

1320s

1330s

1340s

1350s

1360s

14th century

1360s

1370s

1380s

1390s

15th century

1400s

1410s

1420s

1430s

1440s

1450s

1460s

1470s

1480s

1490s

16th century

1500s

1510s

1520s

1530s

1540s

1550s

1560s

1570s

1580s

1590s

17th century

1600s

1610s

1620s

1630s

1640s

1650s

1660s

Gallery

See also
Timeline of the Ming treasure voyages
Timeline of the Jurchens

References

Bibliography

 .

 (alk. paper) 
 

 

 .
 

 
  (paperback).
 
 

 
 .
 .

 
 
 

 

 
 
 
 

 

 

 .

 

 
 .
  
 

 
 

Ming
 
Imperial China
02

01
States and territories established in 1368
States and territories disestablished in 1644
1368 establishments in Asia
14th-century establishments in China
1644 disestablishments in Asia
1640s disestablishments in China